Hydnellum fraudulentum is a tooth fungus in the family Bankeraceae. Found in Australia, it was described as new to science in 1971 by Dutch mycologist Rudolph Arnold Maas Geesteranus from collections made in Victoria.

References

External links

Fungi described in 1971
Fungi of Australia
Inedible fungi
fraudulentum
Taxa named by Rudolf Arnold Maas Geesteranus